Nyridela xanthocera is a moth of the subfamily Arctiinae. It was described by Francis Walker in 1856. It is found in Mexico, Guatemala, Costa Rica and Panama.

References

Euchromiina
Moths described in 1856